Theodore Otto Uhlaender (October 21, 1939 – February 12, 2009) was a Major League Baseball outfielder for the Minnesota Twins, Cleveland Indians and Cincinnati Reds from –. He was also the father of Olympic women's skeleton competitor Katie Uhlaender.

Signed by the Twins out of Baylor University in 1961, he made his major league debut four years later. He was ineligible for the 1965 World Series because his promotion occurred after the August 31 deadline. He became the team's starting center fielder for the next four seasons. Despite the  campaign being totally dominated by pitchers, he managed to finish with a .283 batting average, fifth in the American League . He followed that up with his most productive season, establishing career highs with 152 games played, 93 runs scored, 151 hits and 62 runs batted in (RBI). His first playoff experience was in the 1969 American League Championship Series, with one hit in six at-bats.

He was traded along with Graig Nettles, Dean Chance and Bob Miller to the Indians for Luis Tiant and Stan Williams on December 10, 1969.

After he was acquired by the Reds for Milt Wilcox on December 6, 1971, Uhlaender spent his last year as a player in the majors strictly as a reserve outfielder. He served as a pinch hitter during the postseason, going 1-for-2 in the National League Championship Series and getting a double out of four at-bats in the 1972 World Series.

He was a scout for the San Francisco Giants from 2002 until learning he had multiple myeloma in 2008.

Uhlaender died of a heart attack at his ranch in Atwood, Kansas on February 12, 2009, just before his daughter Katie finished second in the women's skeleton World Cup season finale at Utah Olympic Park. Uhlaender's wife, Karen, stated that Katie did not know he had died until after the competition was finished.  In memory of her father, she wears around her neck his ring from the 1972 season in which the Reds won the National League pennant.

References

External links

"Former major league OF Ted Uhlaender dead at 69," The Associated Press, Saturday, February 14, 2009.
 Thomson, Candus. "Emotional rush for skeleton racer Uhlaender," The Baltimore Sun, Friday, February 27, 2009.

1939 births
2009 deaths
Deaths from cancer in Kansas
Cincinnati Reds players
Cleveland Indians players
Deaths from multiple myeloma
Major League Baseball outfielders
Baseball players from Illinois
People from Rawlins County, Kansas
Minnesota Twins players
Cleveland Indians coaches
New York Yankees scouts
San Francisco Giants scouts
People from Chicago Heights, Illinois
Sportspeople from the Chicago metropolitan area
Baseball players from Kansas